Harry Hanson may refer to:

 Harry Hanson (baseball) (1896–1966), American baseball catcher 
 Harry Hanson (sailor) (1900–1986), Swedish competition sailor

See also
 Harry Hansen (disambiguation)